Red Oak Grove Presbyterian Church and Cemetery is located outside of Tipton, Iowa, United States.   They were listed on the National Register of Historic Places in 2010.

History
The congregation was organized on March 1, 1841 by Scotch Presbyterian settlers in Cedar County, Iowa.  It is the first Presbyterian Church founded in Cedar County and the twelfth in the state of Iowa.   The ten charter members of the church include: Robert Dallas, Miss Sarah Dallas, John and Isabella Ferguson, John Safley, John Chappell, Samuel Yule, Robert and Elizabeth Pirie and Elizabeth Dallas.  The organizational meeting was conducted by the Rev. Michael Hummer, who was an itinerant Presbyterian missionary.  By November 1847 the congregation grew to 22 members.  For the first ten years the congregation had no pastor and was severed by traveling missionaries.

In 1851 the congregation requested that its location be changed to Tipton.  The Presbytery granted its permission and it became known as the First Presbyterian Church of Tipton.  In the meantime the people in Red Oak Grove built a church and requested a separate organization.  The Presbytery granted its request in October 1859, and the Presbyterian Church of Red Oak Grove was organized.  The following year the relationship between the churches was dissolved and Red Oak Grove began a working relationship with the Presbyterian Church in Mechanicsville, Iowa.

Henry Britcher donated land north of the church where the present manse was built in 1899.  The Rev. J.C. Fawcett was the first pastor to occupy the home in 1901.

Red Oak Cemetery
The North Cemetery was organized in 1848 and the plat was made by A.L. Safley.  The South Cemetery was plotted in May 1907.

References

External links
Church Web Site

Religious organizations established in 1841
Neoclassical architecture in Iowa
Buildings and structures in Cedar County, Iowa
Presbyterian churches in Iowa
Churches on the National Register of Historic Places in Iowa
Protestant Reformed cemeteries
Cemeteries on the National Register of Historic Places in Iowa
National Register of Historic Places in Cedar County, Iowa
Scotch-Irish American history
Scottish-American culture in Iowa
1841 establishments in Iowa Territory
Neoclassical church buildings in the United States